Société des anciens textes français (SATF) is a learned society founded in Paris in 1875 with the purpose of publishing all kinds of medieval documents written either in langue d'oïl or langue d'oc (Bulletin de la SATF, 1 (1875), p. 1). Its founding members are Henri Bordier, Joseph de Laborde, A. Lamarle, Paul Meyer, Léopold Pannier, Gaston Paris, Auguste-Henry-Édouard, marquis de Queux de Saint-Hilaire, baron Arthur de Rothschild, baron Edmond de Rothschild, baron James N. de Rothschild and Natalis de Wailly.

From 1875 to 1936, the SATF published a yearly bulletin distributed to its members only.

Since its foundation, the SATF have also published a series of critical editions and even, sometimes, facsimile editions, a series that amounts today to approximately 180 volumes.

Published works

References
 Bulletin de la Société des anciens textes français, 1 (1875), p. 1-5. link

External links
 Bulletin de la Société des anciens textes français in Gallica, the digital library of the BnF.

Book publishing companies of France
Medieval French literature
Text publication societies
1875 establishments in France
Historical societies of France
Mass media in Paris